The 1979 Victorian state election was held on 5 May 1979.

Seat changes
Bendigo Liberal MLC Fred Grimwade contested Central Highlands.
Boronia Liberal MLC Peter Block contested Nunawading.
Monash Liberal MLC Charles Hider contested the lower house seat of Glenhuntly.
Northern National MLC Stuart McDonald contested Bendigo.

Retiring Members
Note: Liberal MLA Athol Guy (Gisborne) had resigned prior to the election; no by-election was held.

Labor
Val Doube MLA (Albert Park)
Alan Lind MLA (Dandenong)
Doug Elliot MLC (Melbourne)
John Galbally MLC (Melbourne North)

Liberal
Neville Hudson MLA (Werribee)
Sam Loxton MLA (Prahran)
Ian McLaren MLA (Bennettswood)
Joe Rafferty MLA (Glenhuntly)
Bill Stephen MLA (Ballarat South)
Sir Kenneth Wheeler MLA (Essendon)
William Fry MLC (Higinbotham)
Stan Gleeson MLC (South Western)

Legislative Assembly
Sitting members are shown in bold text. Successful candidates are highlighted in the relevant colour. Where there is possible confusion, an asterisk (*) is also used.

Legislative Council
Sitting members are shown in bold text. Successful candidates are highlighted in the relevant colour. Where there is possible confusion, an asterisk (*) is also used.

References

Psephos - Adam Carr's Election Archive

Victoria
Candidates for Victorian state elections